Marine fuel management (MFM) is a multi-level approach to measuring, monitoring, and reporting fuel usage on a boat or ship, with the goals of reducing fuel usage, increasing operational efficiency, and improving fleet management.  MFM has grown in importance due to the rising costs of marine fuel and increasing government oversight of the pollution generated by the world's shipping fleet.

Effective MFM requires that you know:

 How much fuel is likely to be used
 How much fuel is used
 How the fuel was used
 What things impact fuel usage
 And by how much

Manual methods of measuring fuel usage, i.e. fuel tank dipping or sounding, typically do not tell how much fuel was used:

 Traveling versus idling while in port or on station
 By a specific engine (port versus starboard, for example)
 Performing one job versus another
 By crew A versus crew B on similar voyages

Without a clear understanding of how fuel is being used, there is no operational baseline from which to compare any kind of fuel conservation tool or activity. Without a baseline, there is no way to determine if conservation strategies are actually working.

MFM allows a fleet owner to track actual fuel consumption and relate fuel consumption to the work performed by the vessel. It supports the analysis of the effectiveness of operating strategies and helps develop a clearer understanding of how well a vessel uses its fuel.

MFM Main Functional Areas
 Operational Performance
 Engineering and Maintenance Management
 Management Oversight

Operational Performance
Operational performance includes those functional areas that impact the actual performance of a vessel or fleet. It includes fuel monitoring, inventory control, accounting, and engine throttle management.

Fuel Monitoring
Many marine vessels do not provide a way for captain and crew to measure and monitor fuel usage while underway. An optimum system onboard would include the ability to instantaneously monitor fuel burn rates from the wheelhouse. Individual engine and generator burn rates would be included, as well as fuel tank levels. This proactive monitoring would allow the crew to make decisions that positively impact fuel burn rates and efficiency.

Inventory Control
Fuel tanks need to have sensors installed that continuously monitor levels as fuel is taken onboard and burned by engines and generators. Periodically measuring tank levels using traditional manual methods is not accurate enough or timely, given the volumes of fuel that a marine engine can consume. Flow meters or gauges should be installed on transfer lines where fuel is taken onboard or off-loaded.

Accounting
In some parts of the world, fuel theft is an ongoing concern. Consequently, the accurate measurement of fuel taken on board coupled with the fuel actually consumed by engines and generators, is an important part of MFM. Flow meters should be installed in all fuel transfer lines so accurate fueling data can be captured. This data can then be compared with burn rates to determine whether fuel is being transferred off the vessel secretively. 

Beyond fuel theft, many governmental jurisdictions require that all fuel spill incidents be recorded and reported to the local authorities. For example, the Marine Department of the Government of Hong Kong has specific guidelines for responding to accidental marine fuel spills which reflect international requirements as promulgated by MARPOL, the International Convention for the Prevention of Pollution From Ships.

Additionally, accounting for fuel usage at various points along a voyage provides the ability to tie fuel burn and its associated costs to shipping or container rates. For example, understanding how a vessel burns fuel on certain parts of a voyage, allows the more accurate bidding of container rates so profit margins stay healthy. Consequently, varying shipping rates based on documented fuel usage rates can allow a shipper to bid more aggressively.

A modern marine fuel management system would help in monitoring fuel usage, fuel transfer bunkering events and could be configured to sound an audible alarm when refilling fuel tanks might lead to a spill.

Throttle Management
Vessel operators have the most control over fuel usage by the way they use the engine(s) throttle. Wind, current, hull condition, load, and propulsion system health can all impact fuel burn both positively or negatively. Some operators choose to lower engine speed, and hence vessel speed, in an attempt to save fuel. However, engine RPM and vessel speed alone are not indicative of total fuel consumption, so arbitrarily lowering engine speed does not guarantee fuel savings. One must do the workflow calculations on how the propulsion system is operating under existing changing conditions and then tie that to fuel consumption. Simply lowering engine RPM does not guarantee an optimum vessel speed setting based on conditions. Some modern fuel management systems are designed to perform these calculations while underway and make recommendations to the vessel master.

Engineering and Maintenance Management
As with any capital asset, manufacturers typically include the standard maintenance practices and procedures needed to keep the asset functioning properly and within design specifications. In many cases, scheduled maintenance routines are based on laboratory or design parameters and do not necessarily represent the optimum. MFM supports proper maintenance on marine engines and generators by using the actual fuel burned or hours operated as the basis for performing maintenance routines. This condition-based maintenance program more accurately reflects the operating environment of the engine, but more importantly, reduces or eliminates unnecessary maintenance work.

Management Oversight
Management functions within MFM include:

 Vessel performance analysis and overall fleet performance
 Crew analysis with emphasis on applying lessons learned as best practice across the fleet
 Key Performance Indicator (KPI) gathering across the fleet to include fuel burned per mile or per ton; throttle settings at various points on a voyage; engine RPMs and exhaust gas analysis; and vessel performance against hull conditions.
 Fuel management from purchasing to transfers to usage
 Chartered vessel fuel performance and adherence to contractual obligations

See also
 Energy conservation
 Fuel
 Fuel oil
 Fuel price risk management
 Fuel management systems
 Marine propulsion
 MARPOL
 Ship pollution
Environmental impact of shipping

References

Ship management
Fleet management